Matjaž Mlakar (born 23 December 1981 in Sevnica) is a Slovenian professional handball player.

Information
Height: 189 cm
Weight: 103 kg
Position: Pivot

Career
Clubs: Sevnica, Gorenje, Celje, Maribor Branik, Tatran Prešov.

References

1981 births
Living people
People from Sevnica
Slovenian male handball players
Expatriate handball players
Slovenian expatriate sportspeople in Slovakia